Marcelo Tosi (born 14 August 1969) is a Brazilian equestrian. At the 2012 Summer Olympics he competed in the Individual and Team eventing. He competed at the 2020 Summer Olympics.

References

External links

Brazilian male equestrians
1969 births
Living people
Olympic equestrians of Brazil
Equestrians at the 2008 Summer Olympics
Equestrians at the 2012 Summer Olympics
Pan American Games medalists in equestrian
Pan American Games silver medalists for Brazil
Pan American Games bronze medalists for Brazil
Equestrians at the 1999 Pan American Games
Equestrians at the 2011 Pan American Games
Equestrians at the 2019 Pan American Games
Medalists at the 2011 Pan American Games
Medalists at the 2019 Pan American Games
Equestrians at the 2020 Summer Olympics
People from Piracicaba
Sportspeople from São Paulo (state)
21st-century Brazilian people
20th-century Brazilian people